Alfalah University is a private university established in 2011 in Jalalabad, Nangarhar Province, Afghanistan.  It is the only accredited university in Nangarhar Province of eastern Afghanistan.

The institute quickly became one of the largest private higher education institutions in the east of Afghanistan.  It was elevated to university status by the Ministry of Higher Education in 2020.  The University is a hub for education, research, innovation, and public engagement; it offers both undergraduate and graduate degrees in multiple disciplines.  These include courses in management, law, journalism, economics, and information technology at the undergraduate level, and business administration, law, and shariah at the graduate level.

Faculties
 Faculty of Economics
 Faculty of Engineering
 Faculty of Journalism
 Faculty of Sharia'h
 Faculty of Law

References

External links
 

Universities in Afghanistan
Educational institutions established in 2011
2011 establishments in Afghanistan
Education in Afghanistan